Ashta Chamma is a 2008 Indian Telugu-language romantic comedy film written and directed by Mohan Krishna Indraganti. The film stars Nani, Swathi Reddy, Srinivas Avasarala, and Bhargavi with Tanikella Bharani in a supporting role. An adaptation of Oscar Wilde's play The Importance of Being Earnest, the film deals with four quirky characters interwoven in a romantic narration. Upon release, the film received positive reviews and was successful at the box office. Swathi won the Filmfare Award and Nandi Award for Best Actress for her performance as Lavanya.

Plot 
 
The movie starts with a small introduction that all the female fans of actor Mahesh Babu, who have an excessive desire of marrying him, were "too angry" with him when he got married. Even Lavanya is one of them. Although, her aunt Mandira Devi repeatedly tells her that it's not possible to marry Mahesh, she pays no heed and stays depressed for days. Finally, she compromises with her aunt by demanding that her husband's name must be Mahesh. Her aunt relents and starts the search for the groom, though in vain.

Her neighbor, Anand, promises to help Lavanya by finding a seemingly perfect "Mahesh." Finally, as all hope seems gone, Anand meets someone named Mahesh accidentally in a bar. He becomes friends with him and sees that Mahesh is a classy, handsome guy. After "testing" him, Anand introduces Mahesh to Lavanya and the couple seem destined to be together forever. Then one day Lavanya reveals her passion for the name of "Mahesh" and she reveals the reason that she loves him because his name is Mahesh. The reason utterly shocks Mahesh. Then in drunken state he shares the conversation had with Lavanya to Anand. The next morning, Anand finds a picture of a girl in Mahesh's wallet. The picture has a note on the back, addressed to a "Rambabu." Anand asks who Rambabu is, and Mahesh reveals the twist: his name is actually "Rambabu."

Then Rambabu narrates his story to Anand, which starts at a village called "Lakkavaram." Rambabu is the village head and all people of the village treats him as a god. He has a sister called Varalakshmi (the girl who is in the photo which Anand found) and Ammaji a caretaker to Varalakshmi. After his father's death Rambabu became lonely and he decides to take a break from his Godly image. So he went to Hyderabad and enjoys as Mahesh. He lied her sister that he was going to meet his friend Mahesh for a business purposes in Hyderabad and changes his identity to Mahesh and lives to the fullest.

After knowing this, Anand decides to be loyal with Rambabu. Then suddenly Lavanya calls him and arranges a meeting with her aunt. Later in the meeting Mandira mistreats Rambabu as a roadside romeo and drives him out. Then Anand advises Rambabu to not make any further moves until he makes a plan.

Then Anand suddenly changes his plan and shifts to Lakkavaram to meet Varalakshmi. After meeting with Anand she falls for him at first sight. There Anand announce himself as Mahesh and starts romancing with Varalakshmi. Then Varalakshmi calls his brother and tells about the entry of Mahesh. Rambabu understands the situation warns Anand to leave his sister and he gave a strict instruction to Ammaji to keep an eye on the both of them till he comes home. Meanwhile in a farm, Anand learns about the Varalakshmi's passion on the name of Mahesh. Anand became tensed and decides to change his name to Mahesh and meet Sarva Sarma, an old bachelor priest who loves Ammaji, and makes an agreement for 2 lakhs to change his name to Mahesh traditionally. Meanwhile tensed Rambabu rushes back to home and warns Anand to leave his sister.

Then Anand encourages Lavanya to elope and invites her to Lakkavaram. Then Lavanya gives a message of eloping to her aunt through their maid and goes to Lakkavaram there she meets Varalakshmi and misunderstandings aroused creates a lot of chaos. After knowing Lavanya's arrival Rambabu became tensed and tries to stop her but it is too late. Lavanya and Varalakshmi understands that there is no person called Mahesh. They has been cheated by their respective boyfriends. Then Rambabu, Varalakshmi and Anand tries to convince her but all goes to vain. Then Lavanya decides to go back to Hyderabad but there are no buses to Hyderabad that day, so there is no option left. She then decides to stay back with them till the next day.

To stop Lavanya, Anand makes another plan and he makes a call to Mandira who is just came from out of station unknowing of facts. Then after knowing the situation Mandira's best friend Amrutha makes her confident. Then Mandira takes the call of Anand and decided to visit Lakkavaram. Meanwhile Rambabu also makes an offer to Sarva Sarma to change his name to Mahesh traditionally. Then he reveals agreement with Anand. Then the angered Rambabu quarrels with Anand and warns to leave the name, Varalakshmi and Lavanya to him.
Later Anand and Varalakshmi reconciles.

Then as Lavanya is ready to go back, to stop her the situation becomes a chaos. Then Mandira enters the Rambabu's home and observes the sites and places of Rambabu accepts their love. But Lavanya does not want to forgive him. It becomes another quarrel between themselves. Then Ammaji has come back from pilgrimage (after Rambabu came back she went to the pilgrimage for peace).

Then suddenly Mandira recognises her and asks about the baby which she had stolen earlier.(flashback) Then Ammaji reveals that her real name is Anasuya. Who once worked as a caretaker to a baby boy which she had left in railway station to see a superstar for a while. After knowing the baby was missed the feared Anasuya ran away and worked in various places for four years and finally settled as caretaker to Rambabu. Then a sudden reaction comes from Rambabu asking her if she has any proofs for the story. Then she tells about a pink towel with an alphabet 'A' wrapped on baby. Then Rambabu opened his private box and shows the towel to Anasuya, and she recognizes the towel as the same. Then Rambabu reveals that he is an adopted son to his father. His father found him in a train there is no details about the baby so he adopted the baby as his. He confesses these facts on his death bed with his son.

After knowing the truth Rambabu misunderstands Anasuya as his real mother but Mandira reveals that he is the son of Amrutha. After missing her baby she had been depressed a lot she took some time to become normal. Later Mandira informs about her son to Amrutha. Later everybody reconciles. Then finally Lavanya again starts to go back then Amrutha reveals that Rambabu original name is also Mahesh Babu which they kept before he missed.

Then finally Lavanya accepts Mahesh's original name and calls him as Rambabu and they reconcile. Then Anand and Varalakshmi decided to get married with no objections. Then with the order of Rambabu, Anasuya accepts the proposal to Sarva Sarma and they decided to get married. Then finally the film ends with an interesting turn that Mandira reveals her secret crush on a powerstar.

Cast 
 Nani as Rambabu / Mahesh
 Swathi Reddy as Lavanya
 Srinivas Avasarala as Anand
 Bhargavi as Varalakshmi
 Tanikella Bharani as Sarva Sarma
 Hema as Ammaji / Anasuya
 Jhansi as Mandira Devi
 Vasu Inturi as Ranga
 Sivannarayana as Anand's father
 Ragini as Anand's mother
 Madhumani as Amrutha, Mandira's best friend and Rambabu's long-lost mother.

Production 
Indraganti debuted with the National Film Award-winning Grahanam (2005) and followed it up with Mayabazaar (2006). While working on the characters, the story became more female-centric and thereby departed from Wilde's narration. After working on the story's draft of 225 pages for about two months, he began fine-tuning it for another few months. The film was produced by Ram Mohan, his first production venture. Mohan, a management graduate from Indian Institute of Management Ahmedabad, previously worked for UTV Software Communications. While Kalyani Malik was hired to compose the music and the background score, Marthand K. Venkatesh was chosen as the film's editor.

The film is named after Ashta Chamma, a game from the South Indian state of Andhra Pradesh. The game, which is otherwise known as Ludo, was released as part of the film's promotion.

While Indraganti wanted Bhumika Chawla to be cast in the leading role, he chose Colours Swathi in the supporting role. However, when he was unsuccessful in hiring Chawla for the film, he promoted Swathi to the lead role. Swati held a good opinion about Indraganti, whom she thought to be quite an educated director. After confirming Swathi for the role, Indraganti was scouting for three more actors to form the primary cast. During this period, Swathi completed the Tamil film, Subramaniapuram.

Soundtrack

Awards 
Filmfare Awards South
 Best Actress – Telugu – Swathi

Nandi Awards
 Best Home-viewing Feature Film – Ram Mohan
 Best Actress – Swathi

References

External links 
 

2008 films
2000s Telugu-language films
Films based on The Importance of Being Earnest
Indian romantic comedy films
2008 romantic comedy films
Films directed by Mohan Krishna Indraganti